Than Wyenn (May 2, 1919January 30, 2015) was an American character actor. His acting career spanned more than forty years with more than 150 credits in film and television. He may be best known for his role in the 1960 Twilight Zone episode "Execution", as well as roles in Imitation of Life in 1959 and Splash in 1984.

Early life
Wyenn was from New York City. He studied acting as teenager under Michael Chekhov and Lee Strasberg, among others. He toured nationally with a Shakespearean troupe of actors. Wyenn worked on a farm in Vermont during World War II as part of the U.S. war effort.

Than Wyenn and his wife, Gertrude "Guy" Wyenn (November 19, 1921 - April 5, 2018), moved to Los Angeles following the end of World War II. He was cast in a starring role in the world premiere of Baruch Lumet's stage production Once Upon a Tailor, which debuted at The Circle Theater. His role in Once Upon a Tailor earned him a talent agent, which launched his television and film career.

Film
While much of career focused on television, Wyenn appeared in several notable film roles. Wyenn portrayed Romano, an Italian film representative who attempts to recruit Lana Turner's character, Lora Meredith, in Imitation of Life in 1959. He was also cast as Mr. Ambrose in the 1984 film Splash, opposite Tom Hanks and Daryl Hannah. Other film roles included Beginning of the End in 1957, Pete Kelly's Blues in 1959, The Boy and the Pirates in 1960, and Being There in 1979.

Television
In 1960, Wyenn appeared as Paul Johnson, a villain, in "Execution" during The Twilight Zone's first season. In the episode, Wyenn's character transported to the past straight into a hangman's gallows in the American frontier during the 1800s. "Execution" also starred Russell Johnson and Albert Salmi. He also guest starred on Combat!, in 1965 as Captain Beggs, along with guest star Frank Gorshin in the third-season episode "The Hell Machine". He appeared in Honey West episode one, "The Swingin' Mrs. Jones" (1965) as the driver/waiter. Wyenn's numerous other television credits, spanning the 1950s, 1960s, and 1970s, included Leave it to Beaver, Gunsmoke, Dragnet, Barnaby Jones, Mission: Impossible, The Man from U.N.C.L.E., Perry Mason, Quincy, M.E., The Six Million Dollar Man, T. J. Hooker, Hart to Hart, The Untouchables, Voyage to the Bottom of the Sea, Wanted: Dead or Alive, Burke's Law and Zorro.

Other activities
Wyenn became a voting member of the Academy of Motion Picture Arts and Sciences in 1966. He worked as a drama consultant for the Los Angeles Bureau of Jewish Education for 37 years.

Wyenn and his wife were highly-active in Jewish causes. He was a co-founder of the Yiddish Kinder Theater in Los Angeles. He began documenting Jewish life throughout the world during the 1980s through traveling and painting.

Death
Wyenn died at the Motion Picture & Television Country House and Hospital in Woodland Hills, California, on January 30, 2015, at the age of 95. He was survived by his wife of 71 years, Guy Wyenn, and their sons, Joel and Neil, and five grandchildren.

Filmography

References

External links

1919 births
2015 deaths
American male film actors
American male television actors
American male stage actors
Yiddish theatre performers
Jewish American male actors
Male actors from New York City
21st-century American Jews